Ilya Maksimovich Devin (Russian cyrillic: Илья́ Макси́мович Де́вин; July 20, 1922, Sire Теrizmorga – November 13, 1998, Saransk) was a Mordvin writer.

Life 
He was born in a family of farmers, and after being a soldier in the World War II with the Red Army, he worked in radio and press. He started writing when he was very young and he published several poetry books and the novel «Нардише» in 1969.

He was awarded with Order of the Red Banner of Labour, Order of the Red Star and Order of Friendship of Peoples.

References

1922 births
1998 deaths
20th-century Russian male writers
People from Insarsky Uyezd
People from Staroshaygovsky District
Recipients of the Order of Friendship of Peoples
Recipients of the Order of the Red Banner of Labour
Recipients of the Order of the Red Star
Moksha-language writers
Mordvin people
Russian-language writers
Soviet male poets
Soviet military personnel of World War II